Opinion polling on Scottish independence is continually being carried out by various organisations to gauge public attitudes to independence. The dates for these opinion polls range from the 2014 Scottish independence referendum to the present day. Polling conducted before the 2014 Scottish independence referendum can be found here.

Most polling companies listed here are members of the British Polling Council (BPC) and abide by its disclosure rules. Between January 2015 and December 2022 over 230 polls have been published and recorded in the main table. Polling, even using the same question, can show systematic differences between different polling organisations and sponsors.

The main table includes primarily those polls which ask the same question as the 2014 referendum: "Should Scotland be an Independent Country?". Any variations that might have an impact on the poll result, such as excluding 16- to 17-year-old voters, are recorded in the 'Notes' column. The table also lists some events that may have impacted on polling returns, including the 2016 United Kingdom European Union membership referendum, the Covid pandemic in Scotland and party leadership changes. 

The other tables reflect different ways questions around Independence can be asked, they may produce different results.

Graphical summary

Polls using the 2014 referendum question

Other polling formats

Polls using Remain / Leave Question 
Some organisations have chosen to commission polls that adopt the remain / leave formulation that was used in the 2016 United Kingdom European Union membership referendum. 

The use of this format has been criticised by pro-independence politicians. SNP depute leader Keith Brown said in September 2019 that it was "a deliberate bid to confuse independence with Brexit".

Polls on a "de facto" referendum 
On 23 November 2022, the UK Supreme Court ruled that the Scottish Parliament does not have the power to unilaterally hold an independence referendum without the consent of the Westminster Parliament. Following that judgment, the SNP reiterated its intention to campaign in the next UK general election as a de facto independence referendum. 
Question asked is stated in notes field.

Scottish Social Attitudes Survey
Since devolution, the annual Scottish Social Attitudes Survey has contained a question on independence.

Respondents are asked Which of these statements comes closest to your view?
Scotland should become independent, separate from the UK and the European Union
Scotland should become independent, separate from the UK but part of the European Union
Scotland should remain part of the UK, with its own elected parliament which has some taxation powers
Scotland should remain part of the UK, with its own elected parliament which has no taxation powers
Scotland should remain part of the UK without an elected parliament.

A report released in 2017, entitled From Indyref1 to Indyref2? The State of Nationalism in Scotland, detailed the previous responses from this survey by grouping options one and two as "independence", options three and four as "devolution" and option five as "No Parliament".

Timing of a second referendum 
Separate from the question of how Scots might vote in a hypothetical second referendum is the question of whether there should be a second referendum. Once again the responses vary with exactly how the question is asked. There is a wide variety of timeframes used on this topic

UK-wide polling
Various companies have polled voters across the entire United Kingdom on various questions surrounding the issue of Scottish independence, from the standard Yes/No question as used in the 2014 referendum, to whether the Scottish government should be allowed to hold a second referendum. The results of these polls are displayed below. 

Polls using 2014 referendum question

On the Scottish Government’s authority to hold a referendum

Polling on a second referendum

Timing of a Second Independence Referendum

British Social Attitudes Survey

See also

 Opinion polling for the 2014 Scottish independence referendum

Notes

Additional notes - Find Out Now operates online with alternative methodologies to established panel based companies. Their webpage invites their clients to “Ask our community as a whole….or DEFINE ONE OF YOUR OWN.” This had led to suggestion of Nationalist Bias. https://www.scottishdailyexpress.co.uk/news/politics/scexit-poll-showing-almost-record-29015930

References

External links
What Scotland Thinks

Opinion polls
Independence
Scotland
Independence|Scottish Indepndence|Politics|Polling|Opinion Polls